Edward A. LeLacheur Park is a baseball park located on the banks of the Merrimack River in Lowell, Massachusetts. It is home to the UMass Lowell River Hawks baseball team, which competes in the America East Conference at the NCAA Division I level. It was home to the Lowell Spinners, previously the New York–Penn League Class A Short Season affiliate of the Boston Red Sox.

History
The park was built between a partnership with the city of Lowell and the University of Massachusetts Lowell. The park was named for State Representative Edward A. LeLacheur, who led the initial redevelopment of Lowell, and opened in 1998. The park was built adjacent to the residential section of UML. Populous (formerly HOK Sport)  designed the park. It offers views of the Aiken Street Bridge, Lawrence Mills, Fox Hall, and University Suites. The seating bowl is raised above the field. A concourse surrounds the top of the park where the refreshment, merchandise stands, and bathrooms are located. The design enables an open view while waiting in line.

Two seating expansions have been considered since the park opened. One plan would have added 600-1,000 seats on the third base side. The expansion would match how the first base side is angled towards the infield. The other proposal was to add a smaller version of the Green Monster with seating for approximately 200 people. Due to lack of funds, neither have been built.

The stadium also features the Giant Hood Milk Jug from Fenway Park and all Red Sox retired numbers.

The ballpark held its first concert on July 10, 2008, when Boston-based Celtic punk band Dropkick Murphys played there with The Mighty Mighty Bosstones.

The Lowell City Council voted on Tuesday, July 26th of 2022 to sell Lelacheur Park to UMass Lowell for $1 million dollars.

Attendance
The Spinners have had several consecutive sold-out seasons at LeLacheur Park.

See also
 List of NCAA Division I baseball venues

References

External links

Lowell Spinners home page
UMass Lowell Athletics: Facilities
Edward A. Lelacheur Park Views – Ball Parks of the Minor Leagues

Baseball venues in Massachusetts
Minor league baseball venues
UMass Lowell River Hawks baseball
Sports venues in Lowell, Massachusetts
1998 establishments in Massachusetts
Sports venues completed in 1998
College baseball venues in the United States
Populous (company) buildings
Baseball in Lowell, Massachusetts